Jouko Valdemar Vesterlund (born May 1, 1959 in Rovaniemi) is a former speed skater from Finland, who represented his native country at the 1984 Winter Olympics in Sarajevo, Yugoslavia.

References

External links
 
 Jouko Vesterlund at SkateResults.com

1959 births
Living people
Finnish male speed skaters
Speed skaters at the 1984 Winter Olympics
Olympic speed skaters of Finland
People from Rovaniemi
Sportspeople from Lapland (Finland)